Kincső Takács (born 17 September 1993) is a Hungarian sprint canoeist.

She participated at the 2018 ICF Canoe Sprint World Championships, winning a medal.

References

External links

Living people
1993 births
Hungarian female canoeists
ICF Canoe Sprint World Championships medalists in Canadian
Sportspeople from Győr
Canoeists at the 2019 European Games
European Games medalists in canoeing
European Games gold medalists for Hungary
Canoeists at the 2020 Summer Olympics
Olympic canoeists of Hungary
21st-century Hungarian women